Saxinis is a genus of case-bearing leaf beetles in the family Chrysomelidae. There are at least 10 described species in Saxinis.

Species
 Saxinis apicalis J. L. LeConte, 1884
 Saxinis deserticola Moldenke, 1970
 Saxinis hornii Fall, 1909
 Saxinis knausii Schaeffer, 1906
 Saxinis omogera Lacordaire, 1848
 Saxinis saucia J. L. LeConte, 1857
 Saxinis sierramadrensis Moldenke, 1970
 Saxinis sinuata Schaeffer, 1906
 Saxinis sonorensis Jacoby, 1889
 Saxinis subpubescens Schaeffer, 1906

References

Further reading

 Arnett, R. H. Jr., M. C. Thomas, P. E. Skelley and J. H. Frank. (eds.). (21 June 2002). American Beetles, Volume II: Polyphaga: Scarabaeoidea through Curculionoidea. CRC Press LLC, Boca Raton, Florida .
 Arnett, Ross H. (2000). American Insects: A Handbook of the Insects of America North of Mexico. CRC Press.
 Richard E. White. (1983). Peterson Field Guides: Beetles. Houghton Mifflin Company.

 Riley, Edward G., Shawn M. Clark, and Terry N. Seeno (2003). "Catalog of the leaf beetles of America north of Mexico (Coleoptera: Megalopodidae, Orsodacnidae and Chrysomelidae, excluding Bruchinae)". Coleopterists Society Special Publication no. 1, 290.

External links

 NCBI Taxonomy Browser, Saxinis

Clytrini
Chrysomelidae genera